Blue Route may refer to:

Blue Route (Nova Scotia), a cycling network under construction in the province of Nova Scotia
Interstate 476, a highway in Pennsylvania known as the Blue Route

See also
 Blue Line (disambiguation)
 Blue belt (disambiguation)